Newcastle usually refers to:
Newcastle upon Tyne, a city and metropolitan borough in Tyne and Wear, England
Newcastle-under-Lyme, a town in Staffordshire, England
Newcastle, New South Wales, a metropolitan area in Australia, named after Newcastle upon Tyne

Newcastle, New Castle or New Cassel may also refer to:

Places

Australia
City of Newcastle, a local government area in New South Wales
County of Newcastle, a cadastral unit in South Australia
Division of Newcastle, a federal electoral division in New South Wales
Electoral district of Newcastle, an electoral district of the New South Wales Legislative Assembly
Electoral district of Newcastle (South Australia) 1884–1902, 1915–1956 in the South Australian House of Assembly
Newcastle, New South Wales, a city in New South Wales
Newcastle Waters, a town and locality in the Northern Territory
Newcastle West, New South Wales, inner suburb of the city
Toodyay, Western Australia, known as Newcastle until 1910

Canada
Newcastle, Alberta, a former village now within the Town of Drumheller
Newcastle, New Brunswick, a former town, now part of Miramichi
Newcastle, Ontario, a community in the Municipality of Clarington in Durham Region
Newcastle District, a historic district in Upper Canada which existed until 1849
Newcastle Parish, New Brunswick
Newcastle (electoral district), a provincial electoral district in the Canadian province of British Columbia

Republic of Ireland
Newcastle, Clonfad, a townland in Clonfad civil parish, barony of Fartullagh, County Westmeath
Newcastle, County Tipperary
Newcastle, County Wicklow
Newcastle, Dublin
Newcastle, Kilcleagh, a townland in Kilcleagh civil parish, barony of Clonlonan, County Westmeath
Newcastle, Lickbla, a townland in Lickbla civil parish, barony of Fore, County Westmeath
Newcastle West, County Limerick

Jamaica
Newcastle, Jamaica

Saint Kitts and Nevis
Newcastle, Saint Kitts and Nevis

South Africa
Newcastle, KwaZulu-Natal, a city in northern KwaZulu-Natal
Newcastle Local Municipality, administrative area in the Amajuba district in KwaZulu-Natal

United Kingdom

England
Newcastle, Shropshire (Newcastle on Clun), a village (and parish) in south Shropshire
Newcastle-under-Lyme, the principal town of the Borough of Newcastle-under-Lyme, Staffordshire
Borough of Newcastle-under-Lyme, a local government district with borough status in Staffordshire
Newcastle-under-Lyme (UK Parliament constituency), a constituency represented in the House of Commons
Newcastle-under-Lyme Rural District, a rural district in the county of Staffordshire
Newcastle upon Tyne, a city in Tyne and Wear
Newcastle City Centre, the central business district of Newcastle upon Tyne
Newcastle upon Tyne Central (UK Parliament constituency), a constituency represented in the House of Commons
Newcastle-upon-Tyne (UK Parliament constituency), a former borough constituency in the county of Northumberland

Northern Ireland
Newcastle, County Down, a small town in County Down lying at the foot of the Mourne Mountains an area of outstanding natural beauty.

Wales
Newcastle, Monmouthshire
Newcastle, Bridgend, an area and electoral ward
Newcastle Emlyn, Carmarthenshire

United States
New Castle, Alabama, an unincorporated community in Jefferson County
Newcastle, California, an unincorporated town in Placer County
New Castle, Colorado, a home rule municipality in Garfield County
New Castle, Delaware, a city in New Castle County
New Castle County, Delaware, the northernmost of the three counties
New Castle Hundred, an unincorporated subdivision of New Castle County, Delaware
New Castle, Indiana, a city in Henry County
Webster City, Iowa, formerly Newcastle, county seat of Hamilton County
New Castle, Kentucky, a city in Henry County
Newcastle, Maine, a town in Lincoln County
Newcastle (CDP), Maine, the main village in the town
Newcastle, Nebraska, a village in Dixon County
Newcastle Township, Dixon County, Nebraska, a township in Dixon County
New Castle, New Hampshire, a town in Rockingham County
New Cassel, New York, an unincorporated place in Nassau County
New Castle, New York, a town in Westchester County
New Castle, Ohio, an unincorporated community in Belmont County
Newcastle, Ohio, an unincorporated community in Coshocton County
Newcastle Township, Coshocton County, Ohio, one of the twenty-two townships of Coshocton County
Newcastle, Oklahoma, the largest city in McClain County
New Castle, Pennsylvania, a city in Lawrence County
New Castle Northwest, Pennsylvania, a census-designated place in Lawrence County
New Castle Township, Schuylkill County, Pennsylvania, a township in Schuylkill County
South New Castle, Pennsylvania, a borough in Lawrence County
Newcastle, Texas, a city in Young County
Newcastle, Utah, an unincorporated community in southwestern Iron County
New Castle, Virginia, the only town in Craig County
Newcastle, Washington, a city in King County
New Cassel, Wisconsin, a former village in Fond du Lac County
Newcastle, Wyoming, a city located in Weston County

Arts and entertainment
Newcastle (film), a 2008 Australian film
Newcastle Publishing Company, a Southern California-based small trade paperback publisher
Newcastle, a playable character in the game Apex Legends

Buildings and facilities

Newcastle Castle, Bridgend, a medieval castle in Wales
New Castle Correctional Facility, a prison located in New Castle, Indiana
Newcastle International Sports Centre, a stadium in Newcastle, New South Wales
New Castle School of Trades, a technical trades school in Pulaski, Pennsylvania
New Palace (Stuttgart) (Das Neues Schloss, sometimes translated as the "New Castle"), a palace in Stuttgart, Germany

Sport

Football clubs
Newcastle Jets FC, an Australian association football club in Newcastle, NSW
Newcastle United F.C., an English association football club based in Newcastle upon Tyne
Newcastle Falcons, an English rugby union club based in Newcastle upon Tyne
Newcastle Knights, an Australian rugby league team based in Newcastle, New South Wales
Newcastle Thunder, an English rugby league club based in Newcastle upon Tyne

Other sporting uses
Newcastle Eagles, the most successful team in the history of the British Basketball League (BBL)
Newcastle International Sports Centre, a stadium in Newcastle, New South Wales

Transportation

Air
Newcastle International Airport, airport of Newcastle-upon-Tyne, England
New Castle Airport, a public airport located in an unincorporated part of New Castle County, Delaware, United States

Rail
New Castle District, a railroad line owned and operated by the Norfolk Southern Railway in Ohio and Indiana, United States
Newcastle railway line, New South Wales, Australia, running from Broadmeadow

Watercraft
HMAS Newcastle, an Adelaide class frigate of the Royal Australian Navy
HMS Newcastle, a name given to eight ships of the British Royal Navy
Newcastle (clipper), 1857 English ship

Other uses
Duke of Newcastle, a title in the UK
Newcastle Brown Ale, a brand of beer produced by Heineken
Newcastle Building Society, a British financial institution
Newcastle disease, a highly contagious bird disease
Newcastle, an Athlon 64 computer processor core revision

See also
Akhaltsikhe ("New Castle"), Georgia
Castelnau (disambiguation) ("New Castle"), places in Occitan-speaking areas
Castelnuovo (disambiguation) ("New Castle"), places in Italian-speaking areas
Châteauneuf (disambiguation) ("New Castle"), places in French-speaking areas
Herceg Novi ("New Castle"), Montenegro (formerly Italian Castelnuovo)
Jaunpils ("New Castle"), Latvia
Kaštel Novi ("New Castle"), Croatia
Kota Bharu ("New Castle"), Malaysia
Neuburg (disambiguation) ("New castle"), places in German-speaking areas
Neuchâtel (disambiguation) ("New castle"), places in French-speaking areas
Neufchâtel (disambiguation) ("New castle"), places in French-speaking areas
Newport, Wales, Casnewydd-ar-Wysg ("New castle-on-Usk") in Welsh
Nové Zámky ("New Castle"), Slovakia
Nowy Zamek ("New Castle"), Poland (formerly German Neuschloß)
Nyborg ("New Castle"), Denmark
Qaleh Now (disambiguation) ("New Castle"), places in Persian-speaking areas
Shinshiro ("New Castle"), Japan
Tazeh Qaleh (disambiguation) ("New Castle"), places in Azeri- and Turkmen-speaking areas